WFLC (97.3 FM) is a radio station in Miami, Florida. Owned by Cox Media Group, WFLC's studios and offices are located on North 29th Avenue in Hollywood.  The transmitter site is off NW 210 Street in Miami Gardens.

WFLC broadcasts in the HD Radio format.  The HD-2 channel carries all-1980's hits.

History

WIOD-FM, WCKR-FM
On September 1, 1946 the station signed on as WIOD-FM.  It was the FM counterpart to WIOD and mostly simulcast its programs.  The owner was the Isle of Dreams Broadcasting Corporation, reflected in its call letters.  The studios were located on Collins Island in Biscayne Bay, giving the company its "Isle of Dreams" name.  WIOD-FM was one of two FM stations going on the air in 1946 in Miami; the other, WQAM-FM, signed off in the 1950s, making WFLC Miami's oldest, continuously operating FM station.

In 1956, the Biscayne Television Corporation, a partnership of Cox Publishing, owner of The Miami News, and Knight Publishing, owner of The Miami Herald, launched WCKT-TV (now WSVN).  The call letters represented Cox, Knight and Television.  Biscayne Broadcasting also bought WIOD-AM-FM, changing their call signs to WCKR and WCKR-FM.  Just as WIOD-AM-FM were network affiliates of NBC Radio, WCKT-TV was an NBC television affiliate.

In 1962, the Federal Communications Commission stripped the Cox-Knight partnership of its broadcast licenses due to violations of ethics and licensing rules when Cox-Knight sought to build the TV station. On January 1, 1963, the Miami Valley Broadcasting Corporation, which was a subsidiary of Cox, took over control of the two radio stations and returned the call letters to WIOD and WIOD-FM.  An advertisement in Broadcasting Magazine said the stations provided "expertly programmed adult information and entertainment."  The stations aired a mix of middle of the road music, news and talk shows, along with news and features from NBC Radio.

WAIA
In 1966, the simulcast with the AM ended; WIOD-FM adopted a beautiful music format, playing instrumental versions of pop music and Broadway and Hollywood tunes.  In 1971, the station switched its call letters to WAIA, representing the coastal highway known as Florida State Road A1A.  The station moved from instrumental beautiful music to all vocals, mixing Middle of The Road music with Soft Adult Contemporary hits.

In the early 1980s, the station began making the presentation more upbeat and it stepped up the tempo of the music, moving to an adult contemporary format as "97 A1A."

WGTR
In 1986, the station switched to album rock as WGTR.  The previous year, WINZ-FM (now WZTU) had changed from a rock format to Top 40, leaving Miami with no album rock station (WSHE was a Rock 40 station at this point in its history, and very highly rated, while eschewing Classic Rock and older songs). The station called itself "97 GTR" with the call letters standing for GuiTaR.

WFLC

In 1990, Cox flipped the station to hot adult contemporary as WFLC, "Coast 97.3". The station positioned itself between contemporary hit radio (CHR) leader WHYI and soft music outlet WLYF. WFLC's Hot AC format stayed in place for nearly 24 years.

On January 17, 2014, WFLC flipped to CHR itself as Hits 97.3, putting it in direct competition with WHYI.

On March 27, 2020, the station temporarily rebranded 97.3 Quarantine Radio in reference to the stay-at-home order issued by Florida due to the COVID-19 pandemic, adding commercial-free dance mixes twice-daily. On June 3, after branding itself as being "under construction" the week immediately prior, WFLC relaunched Hits with a new on-air lineup and morning show, while maintaining the existing CHR format. Despite the relaunch, the station failed to make any more traction than before, holding a 2.6 share in the Nielsen Audio Ratings for August 2021, significantly behind that of WHYI, but slightly ahead of WPOW.

On September 23, 2021, director of operations Jill Strada left WFLC as part of a series of layoffs by Cox Media. The following morning, the station stunted for six hours with a loop of songs containing the word "rhythm" in their titles, after which it relaunched as Hits 97.3, the Rhythm of Miami, flipping to a rhythmic hot adult contemporary format. Mediabase still reported WFLC as a Top 40 station until around June 2022, when it officially moved to the Hot AC panel.

References

External links

FLC
Cox Media Group
1946 establishments in Florida
Radio stations established in 1946
Rhythmic adult contemporary radio stations